1Malaysia (pronounced One Malaysia in English and Satu Malaysia in Malay) was a programme designed by Malaysian 6th Prime Minister Najib Tun Razak in summer 2009 with the stated goal of promoting ethnic harmony, national unity, and efficient governance. 

After the 2018 Malaysian general election, in which long-time Barisan Nasional's government collapsed with its defeat and Pakatan Harapan's ascendent as the new government, alongside with Najib's ousting, the concept was abolished and replaced with Sayangi Malaysiaku, a concept that was created by Mahathir Mohamad, together with other major changes made by the new government during his premiership.

National campaign 

1Malaysia is a concept introduced by former Prime Minister Najib Tun Razak to promote national unity. According to Razak, the eight values of the concept are high performance culture, accuracy, knowledge, innovation, integrity, strong will, loyalty and wisdom.

Logo and slogan 
An official logo and slogan has been introduced along with the launch of 1Malaysia concept. The logo is the symbol of '1' which incorporates the national Jalur Gemilang flag and the word Malaysia. The government has spent RM38 million to promote former Prime Minister Najib Abdul Razak's 1Malaysia concept in 2010, said Deputy Minister in the Prime Minister's Department T Murugiah.

Slogan

Public policy 
Improving government efficiency is a major goal of 1Malaysia. The use of Key Performance Indicators (KPIs), metrics and targets more typically used in private business, and National Key Result Areas (NKRAs) is thus naturally an important part of the 1Malaysia effort. Najib says, "The government is committed to carrying out a transformation programme as its main agenda based on approaches and philosophy of 1Malaysia – people first, performance now."

Immediately after assuming the office of Prime Minister of Malaysia, Dato Seri Najib Tun Razak introduced a series of KPIs to measure and improve the efficiency and quality of government services as well as realizing the 1Malaysia concept. Najib said that KPIs were implemented to ensure "the people’s satisfaction...whether they are satisfied with our service, whether we have solved their problems".

Najib's announcement of the KPI effort was generally well-received. Then Deputy Prime Minister Tan Sri Muhyiddin Yassin said the KPI formula was a yardstick against which the people could measure the performance of Najib and the government. He said the KPIs would provide motivation for every minister to perform well.

The KPIs provide a mechanism for the evaluation of ministries and other government agencies, including performance reviews, carried out every six months. Each ministry has been required to establish specific KPIs, including that focus on policy outcomes over the traditional emphasis on inputs typically found in government performance assessments and planning. KPIs include detailed job descriptions and goals for ministers, deputy ministers, and some other senior government officials.

Najib has identified six major policy areas in which KPIs will play an especially important role in improving the effectiveness of the Malaysian government. These are known as National Key Result Areas (NKRAs). The NKRAs include crime prevention, reducing government corruption, increased access to quality education, improvements in the standard of living for low-income groups, upgrades to rural infrastructure, and improvements in public transportation.

Najib also introduced a new cabinet position to support the Unity and Performance Minister in implementing the KPI system. Idris Jala, the former CEO of Malaysia Airlines, was appointed Minister Without a Portfolio and CEO of Performance Management and Delivery Unit (Pemandu), to work with Dr. Koh Tsu Koon in training over 500 government officers to implement the KPI system. As CEO of Pemandu Idris will support the work of Koh, who is the minister in charge of National Unity and Performance Management.

Public services

1Malaysia clinics 
Former Prime Minister Najib's Budget 2010 includes funding for 50 medical clinics to provide basic medical services for illnesses and injuries such as fever, cough, colds, wounds and cuts, diabetes, and hypertension. Malaysia citizens are charged RM1 for treatment and medication. Non-citizens are charged RM15.

1Malaysia Community WiFi 
To boost internet penetration in the country, the government launch free Wi-Fi services as part of the 1Malaysia campaign which known as (Kampung Tanpa Wayar - KTW) (Village Without Wire) in 2011 for rural areas resident. The Wi-Fi services have since been renamed as WiFi Komuniti (WK) - Community WiFi.

1Malaysia email 
It was announced that the RM50 million contract was awarded to a company called Tricubes Bhd to run the 1Malaysia email project as part of the government's social networking project in which free email accounts would be given to the public to communicate with the government. Former Prime Minister Datuk Seri Najib Razak announced the "1Malaysia" email project in April last year as part of his administration's Economic Transformation Program (ETP), saying it would have a gross national income (GNI) impact of RM39 million (US$14.4 million) by 2015.

1Malaysia Development Berhad 
A government-owned firm 1Malaysia Development Berhad was formed through the renaming sovereign wealth fund called Terengganu Investment Authority (TIA).  Through Najib's efforts the company has focus on strategic development projects in the areas of energy, real estate, tourism and agribusiness.

Kedai Rakyat 1Malaysia (1Malaysia People's Grocery Stores) 

In 2011, the 1Malaysia franchise was branched off into a grocery store franchise going by the name Kedai Rakyat 1Malaysia (KR1M), with the first store being located at the Kelana Jaya Line Light Rail Transit (LRT) station in Kuala Lumpur. The franchise was aimed at allowing the low income group to obtain cheaper groceries and lighten their burden besides bringing Malaysians closer to the significance of 1Malaysia.

Non-governmental organizations

1Malaysia Foundation 
The 1Malaysia Foundation (Y1M) was established in 2009 to promote and develop the idea of 1Malaysia. Y1M works to co-ordinate and supplement government and private-sector activities related to 1Malaysia. Dr Chandra Muzaffar, the chairman of the Y1M Board of Trustees, said, "Y1M is planning to expand and strengthen the commitment from all Malaysians towards national unity through various activities to increase public awareness and community development."

1Malaysia Youth Fund 
The 1Malaysia Youth Fund was launched to provide financial support for young people to undertake creative projects that nurture national unity. RM20 million was allocated for the fund under Malaysia's budget passed in 2010. The fund was proposed by the Barisan Nasional Youth Lab.

Former Prime Minister Najib said that 1Malaysia Youth Fund reflected the government's commitment to empowering young people. "The scope and the projects should address three criteria – focus on nurturing unity in Malaysia, have a multiplier effect on the general community, and be led by young people. The objective is to encourage youths to use their imagination to the fullest. We want them to be creative and innovative. Maybe their ability may exceed our expectations, and maybe they can do something which has not been thought of by us", said Najib.

Public response to 1Malaysia

Interpretation 
A year after the concept's introduction, the 4th and 7th Prime Minister and previous mentor to Najib, Mahathir Mohamad reportedly said that he "masih tidak faham" (“still doesn't understand”) the concept. Almost two years later, the public similarly, based on an opinion poll in July 2010, were wary of the concept. In particular, the non-Malays surveyed, according to The Malaysian Insider, "were almost split on the Najib administration's national unity agenda with 46 per cent of the respondents believing that the 1Malaysia concept is only a political agenda to win the non-Malay votes," and "only 39 per cent of the non-Malays believed that the concept introduced by Najib after he took over the government was a sincere effort to unite all races in Malaysia".

Criticism of public services 
The 1Malaysia clinics was criticised for its service, especially for their lack of equipment, expired medicines, unqualified assistant medical officers
and lack of civil manners by its nurse staff towards patients.

The 1Malaysia Village Without Wire programme (Kampung Tanpa Wayar - KTW) has met with a lot of criticism from the rural area's community with many of them labelling the project as "failed" due to the frequent malfunction and slow Wi-Fi services.

The 1Malaysia email has been criticised by the public and the opposition Pakatan Rakyat on the waste of money involved and that Tricubes used to be in financial difficulty.  After the public outcry, Najib had to backtrack stating that this was a private sector initiative and that acceptance of the email accounts was voluntary. Protests have been organised against the project on Facebook and parodied on a website.

The 1Malaysia Development Berhad company has been saddled with controversies such as the purchase of overpriced land from Tadmax Resources, a company linked to the Port Klang Free Zone scandal.

Complaints have been received that the groceries sold at KR1M were more expensive compared to those sold in hypermarkets around Malaysia. There have been allegations of poor product quality in its product line, namely children's milk formula, fresh milk, condensed milk, sweetened condensed creamer, oyster sauce, fruit jam, canned chicken curry, mango cordial, ghee compounds, peanuts, creamy peanut butter, crunchy peanut butter, crispy peanut butter and tinned sardines in tomato sauce. KR1M has instructed its suppliers to send their products for periodical laboratory testing.

Bumiputera rights 
Former Prime Minister Najib's efforts to liberalise government policies and create a more open policy towards all races with 1Malaysia led Malay rights group Perkasa to seek further clarification on the policy, as they feared that his 1Malaysia would undermine Malay or Bumiputera rights in favour of minorities in Malaysia.

Anwar Ibrahim's suspension from parliament 

On 22 April 2010, Anwar Ibrahim the leader of Malaysia's opposition, was censured by Malaysia's parliament for remarks he made during a press conference in parliament on 30 March 2010.  Anwar had claimed to have documents linking 1Malaysia, One Israel, and the public relations firm APCO Worldwide (APCO), but refused to allow access to the documents when challenged. It is against Malaysia's foreign policy to have any dealings with Israel, and the appointment of APCO has deeply angered the sensitivities of the Muslims in the country. They wanted Najib to terminate the contract with the company. The Malaysian government and APCO have strongly denied Anwar's allegations. The censure motion passed by the House of Representatives referred Anwar's case to the Rights and Privileges Committee which will recommend punishment for approval by the full chamber. Such punishment could include being banned from parliament. Anwar has retaliated by producing the two documents to back up his statements and refute the government's denials. It was announced that Anwar was to be suspended from parliament by the Parliamentary Rights and Privileges Committee based solely by content of a letter by APCO without him being able to put up a defence for himself. This prompted a walkout by opposition MPs. On 16 December 2010 Anwar and three opposition MPs, Karpal Singh, Azmin Ali and Sivarasa Rasiah were suspended from parliament. Anwar has blamed APCO Worldwide for his and his fellow opposition parliamentarian's suspensions.

Negaraku Malaysia
In conjunction with the 60th National Day celebration in 2017, the government then under the Barisan National coalition, led by then prime minister Najib Razak launched a 'Negaraku' initiative to instill a sense of love for the country. It was used alongside the 1Malaysia concept, which also became Negaraku 1Malaysia concept and logo. The word 'Negaraku' was also used in greetings by the politicians from that coalition on official occasions such as the National Day parade. After Pakatan Harapan took control of the government in May 2018, both the initiative and the concept were abolished.

See also 
 Bangsa Malaysia
 Malaysian Malaysia
 1Malaysia Development Berhad scandal

References

External links 
 

 
2009 in Malaysia
Public policy in Malaysia
Malaysian brands
Malaysian political slogans
Society of Malaysia
Social history of Malaysia